Shakil Chapra (born 1973), better known by his kunya Abu Haleema, is a British Muslim radical activist and extremist preacher. In 2014, he had his passport seized by the British authorities to prevent him leaving the country. In 2015, he was arrested and released on bail. According to the London Evening Standard, he is an associate of Anjem Choudary.

Background
Abu Haleema was born in London to Pakistani immigrants and grew up in South Kilburn. He works part-time as a bus driver. His name, Abu Haleema (أبو حليمة), means Father of Haleema. Haleema is the name of his daughter.

Passport seized
In April 2014, Abu Haleema's home in London was raided by the police, who seized his passport and left a letter from the Home Office explaining that they believed that Haleema intended to travel to Syria to engage in terrorism-related activities. Haleema denied the claim, saying: "They believe I'm involved in terrorism-related activity, which is not true, and that I may have been thinking of going to Syria to fight, which is completely not true."

In January 2015, Abu Haleema was one of around 400 people who had their Twitter accounts closed, reportedly on the orders of the British security services and the CIA.

Arrest
In April 2015, Abu Haleema was arrested in London by officers from the Metropolitan Police's Counter Terrorism Command on suspicion of "encouragement of terrorism contrary to Section 1 of the Terrorism Act 2006". Haleema was later released on bail on condition that he did not use social media to promote his views. He has not been convicted of any offence.

Activism
Abu Haleema is active in social media such as YouTube and Facebook which he uses to spread his views. In January 2016, The Sydney Morning Herald reported that Abu Haleema was attempting to build a support base in Sydney and Melbourne by criticizing moderate Muslim figures in Australia.

References

External links
Abu Haleema - Hope Not Hate.
Padraig Reidy: We cannot choose which free speech we will defend and which we will not.

Living people
English people of Pakistani descent
English Islamists
British Muslim activists
Bus drivers
People from Kilburn, London
1973 births